Eduard Bachmann (22 September 1831  – 18 April 1880) was a German oboist, operatic tenor and theatre director.

Life and career 
Born in Prague, Bachmann attended the Prague Conservatory, where he studied oboe playing under the direction of Professor Bauer. As a trained oboist he undertook a concert tour through Germany with the music director Joseph Labitzky in 1849, was engaged in the theatre orchestra of Preßburg in 1850/51, then went to Dresden, where he was engaged in the military band of the Saxon Life Guards. In 1853 he became a member of the orchestra of Johann Strauss I. One year later he was engaged for the orchestra of the Hungarian National Theatre in Pest.

There he began to train as a singer. On 14 February 1855 he made his debut at the Hungarian National Theatre as "Carlo" in the opera Ernani. He sang several times in the Hungarian and German theaters and worked from December 1855 to March 1856 at the Darmstadt court theater. After that he went to Agram and worked as a Heldentenor in Amsterdam from October 1856 to June 1857. On 31 July 1857 he made his debut in Prague with director Franz Thomé, where he stayed until October 1864.

In the same year he accepted a lifelong engagement at the Hoftheater in Kassel, which was dissolved after the death of the elector in 1867. From 1867 to 1868 he worked at the Hoftheater Dresden, from 1868 to 1871 at the Hoftheater Munich, after interventions from even the king and Richard Wagner  to get the artist released from his Dresden contract. It was also Wagner's idea to use him as Siegfried in his Ring cycle, but he rejected these plans.

He fell ill with diphtheria twice, and his voice deteriorated. He retired from the stage in 1870 at the age of only 39.

He moved to Karlovy Vary where in 1873 he took over the direction of the theatre for two years.

Bachmann died by suicide on 18 April 1880 in Karlsbad at age 48.

Further reading 
 Ludwig Eisenberg: Großes biographisches Lexikon der Deutschen Bühne im XIX. Jahrhundert. Paul Liszt publishing house, Leipzig 1903, .
 K. J. Kutsch, Leo Riemens: Großes Sängerlexikon. Original edition. K. G. Saur, Bern, 1993, first volume A–L, Sp. 125 f.,

External links 
 Bachmann, Eduard on University of Munich
 Bachmann Eduard on Operissimo

1831 births
1880 deaths
Musicians from Prague
Prague Conservatory alumni
German oboists
German operatic tenors
Heldentenors
German theatre directors
19th-century German male opera singers
1880s suicides